Solution may refer to:

 Solution (chemistry), a mixture where one substance is dissolved in another
 Solution (equation), in mathematics
 Numerical solution, in numerical analysis, approximate solutions within specified error bounds
 Solution, in problem solving
 Solution, in solution selling

Other uses
 V-STOL Solution, an ultralight aircraft
 Solution (band), a Dutch rock band
 Solution (Solution album), 1971
 Solution A.D., an American rock band
 Solution (Cui Jian album), 1991
 Solutions (album), a 2019 album by K.Flay

See also
 The Solution (disambiguation)